It's Raining may refer to:

It's Raining (album), a 2004 album by Rain
It's Raining (Rain song), 2004
It's Raining (Irma Thomas song), 1962
"It's Raining", a 1978 song by Darts (band)
"It's Raining", a tango by Ilya Shatrov

See also
Raining Men (disambiguation)